Benjamin Leadbeater (12 January 1773 – 22 March 1851) was a British naturalist, ornithologist and taxidermist.

Benjamin Leadbeater was a renowned merchant of natural history materials in London, England. His shop was located at 19 Brewer Street, Piccadilly. Leadbeater employed many naturalists around the world and supplied specimens to museums. By 1824, his business was known as "Leadbetter & Son" and, by 1838, it was called "John Leadbetter". Around 1858, the business had returned to the name "Leadbetter & Son".

Several species are named in his honour, including the southern ground-hornbill (Bucorvus leadbeateri), Major Mitchell's cockatoo (Lophochroa leadbeateri) and violet-fronted brilliant (Heliodoxa leadbeateri). He described Lady Amherst's pheasant, Chrysolophus amherstiae, in 1829.

References 
 Bo Beolens and Michael Watkins (2003). Whose Bird ? Common Bird Names and the People They Commemorate. Yale University Press (New Haven and London).
Christopher Frost, 1987 A history of British taxidermy. Long Melford, Suffolk 

1760 births
1837 deaths
British ornithologists